King Duncan is a fictional character in Shakespeare's Macbeth.  He is the father of two youthful sons (Malcolm and Donalbain), and the victim of a well-plotted regicide in a power grab by his trusted captain Macbeth. The origin of the character lies in a narrative of the historical Donnchad mac Crinain, King of Scots, in Raphael Holinshed's 1587 The Chronicles of England, Scotland, and Ireland, a history of Britain familiar to Shakespeare and his contemporaries.  Unlike Holinshed's incompetent King Duncan (who is credited in the narrative with a "feeble and slothful administration"), Shakespeare's King Duncan is crafted as a sensitive, insightful, and generous father-figure whose murder grieves Scotland and is accounted the cause of turmoil in the natural world.

Analysis
King Duncan is a father-figure who is generous and kind. Duncan is also firm ("No more that Thane of Cawdor shall deceive / Our bosom interest. Go pronounce his present death / And with his former title greet Macbeth."), insightful ("There's no art / To find the mind's construction in the face."), and sensitive ("This castle hath a pleasant seat. The air / Nimbly and sweetly recommends itself / Unto our gentle senses."). However, the role is full of irony; he is completely deceived in the intents of Macbeth and therefore may come across as naive. Although a modern reader may view Duncan as an incompetent monarch in this respect, Duncan represents moral order within the play and his murder signals the onset of chaos.

King Duncan of Scotland (c. 1001–1040) is the ruler of Scotland whom Macbeth murders for his throne. Shakespeare's Duncan is an elderly man, a respected and noble figure; as Macbeth reflects, he 'Hath borne his faculties so meek, hath been / So clear in his great office, that his virtues / Will plead like angels, trumpet-tongu'd' (1.7.17–19). Duncan's generous and trusting nature contrasts strikingly with the evil which surrounds Macbeth. Though he appears only in Act 1, he is an important symbol of the values that are to be defeated and restored in the course of the play. His generosity and fatherly affection for Macbeth make his murder even more appalling. The unconscious irony is sharp when he greets Macbeth, who is already plotting against him, with a declaration of his own ingratitude, in 1.4.14–16. Duncan's faith, misplaced first in the rebellious Cawdor and then in Macbeth, provides the audience with an introduction to the atmosphere of betrayal that exists throughout the world of the play.

The historical Duncan was a much younger man than Shakespeare's character, only a few years older than Macbeth. The playwright altered Duncan's age to stress the evil of Macbeth's crime, but in fact Macbeth did not murder Duncan; he usurped the crown through a civil war, and Duncan died in battle. The two were first cousins, both grandsons of Duncan's predecessor on the throne of Scotland, King Malcolm II (ruled 1005–1034). Duncan's claim to the throne was somewhat stronger than Macbeth's as it appears that Malcolm II had named Duncan as his heir, although the facts are obscure. However, Macbeth's action was an ordinary political manoeuvre in 11th century Scotland; King Malcolm II took the throne previously by murdering his cousin, Kenneth III (997–1005). Shakespeare devised his version of Duncan's death from an account of an earlier royal assassination, that of Malcolm II's uncle, King Duff (d. 967), in his source, Raphael Holinshed's history.

Film and television performances

Film
Duncan has been played in film adaptations of the play by Anthony Head in 2008, Gary Sweet in 2006, and Tom Reid in 2003. Javier Ronceros performed the role in Dogg's Hamlet, Cahoot's Macbeth (2005) and John Little in Macbeth: The Comedy (2001).  Christopher McCann played Duncan in Macbeth in Manhattan (1999). Greg Korin, John Corvin, and Antti Litja played the role in 1998, 1997, and 1987 respectively.
Erskine Sanford played King Duncan in Orson Welles' 1948 Macbeth, Louis Northop in a 1946 film adaptation, and by Nicholas Selby in 1971 Macbeth
Spottiswoode Aitken and Charles Kent both played Duncan in silent versions of Macbeth in 1916 and 1908 (the first screen version of the play). David Thewlis portrayed the part in Justin Kurzel's 2015 adaptation, while Brendan Gleeson performed the role for Joel Coen in his 2021 version.

In Orson Welles' 1948 film adaptation of Macbeth, the role of King Duncan is reduced. 1.2 is cut entirely as well as generous portions of 1.4.  King Duncan is seen briefly in 1.6 as he enters Macbeth's castle amid considerable pomp. The top of 1.4 with its description of Cawdor's execution has been transplanted to this scene. Banquo's "temple-haunting martlet" speech is given to Duncan. Duncan is later seen asleep in bed for a fleeting moment as Lady Macbeth slinks about in the chamber's shadows. Donalbain has been cut from the film, leaving Duncan with just one son, Malcolm.

Television
Vincent Regan played King Duncan in "ShakespeaRe-Told" Macbeth (2005), Ray Winstone in Macbeth on the Estate (1997), Laurence Payne in "Shakespeare: The Animated Tales" Macbeth (1992), Griffith Jones in A Performance of Macbeth (1979), and Jacques Mauclair in Macbett (1974), Kevin Coughlin on the "Goodyear Television Playhouse" (1955), and Lee Patterson on the "Douglas Fairbanks, Jr., Presents" Dream Stuff (1954).  Other television performers of the role include Philip Madoc (1998), Mark Dignam (1983), Powys Thomas (1961), Malcolm Keen (1960), Leo G. Carroll (1949), Arthur Wontner (1949).

References

Bibliography
Bevington, David, ed., and William Shakespeare. Four Tragedies. Bantam, 1988.

Literary characters introduced in 1603
Male Shakespearean characters
Characters in Macbeth
Fictional Scottish people
Fictional kings
Cultural depictions of Scottish kings
Fictional murdered people

simple:Macbeth#Characters